Hennie Top (born 23 August 1956) is a former professional cyclist from Wekerom, Netherlands. She competed in the women's road race at the 1984 Summer Olympics, finishing 37th. During the 1990s Top was the cycling coach of the United States women's team.

Palmarès

1979
2nd Dutch National Road Race Championships

1980
1st Dutch National Road Race Championships

1981
1st Dutch National Road Race Championships

1982
1st Dutch National Road Race Championships

1984
3rd Dutch National Road Race Championships

1985
1st Stage 1, Grande Boucle Féminine
3rd Stage 4, Grande Boucle Féminine
1st Stage 16, Grande Boucle Féminine

See also
 List of Dutch Olympic cyclists

References

1956 births
Living people
Dutch female cyclists
Dutch sports coaches
Cycling coaches
People from Ede, Netherlands
Cyclists at the 1984 Summer Olympics
Olympic cyclists of the Netherlands
Cyclists from Gelderland
20th-century Dutch women